The men's parallel giant slalom event in snowboarding at the 2002 Winter Olympics was held in Park City, United States. The qualification runs were held on 14 February and the final rounds on 15 February.

Medalists

Qualification

The top 16 racers, based on their qualification time, advanced to the elimination rounds.

Elimination round
In the elimination round, each head-to-head contest consists of two runs. If one competitor wins both runs, that competitor advances. If the runs are split, the racer with the overall fastest time advances.

* In a tie, the winner of the second run advances.

References

Snowboarding at the 2002 Winter Olympics
Men's events at the 2002 Winter Olympics